The Canon de 75 modele 1912 Schneider was a French World War I piece of 75 mm artillery, designed and manufactured by Schneider et Cie in Le Creusot. It entered service with the French horse-mounted artillery in 1912 and a number were sold to the army of Serbia. By the end of the war, all guns in French service were replaced with the more successful and standardised Canon de 75 modèle 1897. The remaining guns were then sold to Poland, where they were used in the Polish-Bolshevik War.

Bibliography 

 

Schneider Electric
World War I field artillery of France
World War I guns
75 mm artillery